Meamar is an Iranian artist based in the United States.

Biography
Meamar was born Ali Meamar in Ahvaz, Iran, in 1956. In 1982, he earned a Masters of Fine Arts in Interior Design and Sculpture from the Accademia delle Belle Arti of Florence, Italy. He then went on to the Accademia d’Arte e Design Leonetto Cappiello of Florence, where he studied Graphic Arts under the guidance of the Master of the Frescoes.

In 1985, Meamar moved to the United States. He currently resides with his wife and two daughters in the San Francisco Bay area.

Exhibits

 2011 – Miami Red Dot Art Fair, Miami, FL
 2010 – New York Art Expo, New York, NY
 2007 – ABRA Gallery, Los Angeles, CA
 2004–Present - Art People Gallery, San Francisco
 1999 - Hilton Fremont, CA
 1989 - Art Expo-Los Angeles, CA
 1988 - Art Expo-Los Angeles, CA
 1987 - Art Expo-Los Angeles, CA
 1983 - Doddoit Gallery-Paris, France
 1982 - Est O Vest Gallery-Rome, Italy
 1982 - Burdek AC Gallery-Zurich, Switzerland
 1982 - Russo Gallery-Rome, Italy
 1981 - Traghetto Gallery-Venice, Italy
 1981 - Center Comunitario-Florence, Italy
 1981 - Center Open Art-Milan, Italy
 1980 - Arttits ABA- Florence, Italy
 1978 - Festival of Art-Florence, Italy

References
"MEAMORPHISM THAT BRIDGES THE GAP BETWEEN FINE ART AND TECHNOLOGY | MEAMAR" June 18, 2020 , https://artpeople.net/2020/06/meamorphism-that-bridges-the-gap-between-fine-art-and-technology-meamar/

"Meamar Dream |Add Schools Creativity"https://www.artpeoplegallery.com/meamar-dream-add-schools-creativity/ June 3, 2016
 “Today’s Top Artists: Meamar,” in Art Business News, September 2010, pp. 20–21.
 “Meamar,” The Guild Sourcebook of Residential Art (2004), p. 270 & 303 (published by Artful Home, LLC - formerly The Guild, Inc.).
 “Meamar,” The Sourcebook of Architectural & Interior Art 16 (2001), pp. 116–17 & 401 (published by Artful Home, LLC - formerly The Guild, Inc.).
 “Allen Meamar” by William Marshak, in What’s Happening, the Tri-City Magazine (Fremont, Newark, Union City), March 1999, pp. 2–3.

External links
 Official website
 Art People Gallery
 Abra Gallery
 Press release, June 2012

1956 births
Iranian artists
Living people